was one of 23 escort destroyers of the Tachibana sub-class of the  built for the Imperial Japanese Navy during the final stages of World War II. Completed in March 1945 the ship was lightly damaged during an American airstrike later that month. She was used to repatriate Japanese personnel after the war until 1947. Mid-year the destroyer was turned over to the United States and subsequently scrapped.

Design and description
The Tachibana sub-class was a simplified version of the preceding  to make them even more suited for mass production. The ships had two Kampon geared steam turbines, each driving one propeller shaft, using steam provided by two Kampon water-tube boilers.

The main armament of the Tachibana sub-class consisted of three Type 89  dual-purpose guns in one twin-gun mount aft and one single mount forward of the superstructure. The single mount was partially protected against spray by a gun shield. The accuracy of the Type 89 guns was severely reduced against aircraft because no high-angle gunnery director was fitted. They carried a total of 25 Type 96  anti-aircraft guns in 4 triple and 13 single mounts. The Tachibanas were equipped with Type 13 early-warning and Type 22 surface-search radars. The ships were also armed with a single rotating quadruple mount amidships for  torpedoes. They could deliver their 60 depth charges via two stern rails and two throwers.

Construction and service 
Kaki (Persimmon) was ordered in Fiscal Year 1943 under the Modified 5th Naval Armaments Supplement Program as part of the Matsu class, but the design was simplified to facilitate production and the ship was one of those built to the modified design. She was laid down on 5 October 1944 by Yokosuka Naval Arsenal, launched on 11 December and completed on 5 March 1945. The ship was assigned to the 11th Destroyer Squadron of the Combined Fleet to work up. Kaki sustained minor damage during when American carrier aircraft of Task Force 58 attacked Kure Naval Arsenal on 19 March. The squadron was briefly attached to the Second Fleet on 1–20 April before rejoining the Combined Fleet. The ship was assigned to the Maizuru Naval District on 15 July with her damage unrepaired. After the surrender of Japan she was stricken from the navy list on 5 October. The destroyer was disarmed and used to repatriate Japanese personnel in 1945–1947. Kaki was turned over to the United States on 4 July of the latter year and subsequently broken up.

Notes

Bibliography

 

 
 

Tachibana-class destroyers
Ships built by Yokosuka Naval Arsenal
1944 ships
World War II destroyers of Japan